Douglas George Fetherling (born 1949), is a Canadian poet, novelist, and cultural commentator. One of the most prolific figures in Canadian letters, he has written or edited more than fifty books, including a dozen volumes of poetry, five book-length fictions, and a memoir. He lives in Vancouver. He has been the weekly literary columnist at five metropolitan newspapers and several national magazines. He has been writer-in-residence at Queen's University, the University of Toronto and the University of New Brunswick. He published under the name Douglas Fetherling until 1999, and thereafter under the name George Fetherling.

He started in the Canadian literary industry in 1966 in Toronto, where he was the first employee of publisher House of Anansi.

A study of Fetherling's books George Fetherling and His Work, edited by Linda Rogers, features essays by W. H. New, George Elliott Clarke, Brian Busby and others.

Selected bibliography

Poetry
 My Experience in the War – 1970
 Our Man in Utopia – 1971
 Café Terminus – 1973
 Eleven Early Poems – 1973
 Achilles' Navel – 1974
 Subroutines – 1981
 Variorum: New Poems and Old, 1965-1985 – 1985
 Moving Towards the Vertical Horizon – 1986
 Rites of Alienation – 1988
 The Dreams of Ancient Peoples – 1990
 Selected Poems – 1994
 Madagascar – 2000
 Singer, An Elegy – 2004
The Sylvia Hotel Poems – 2010
Plans Deranged by Time – 2012

Fiction
 The File on Arthur Moss – 1994
 Jericho – 2005
Tales of Two Cities – 2006
Walt Whitman's Secret - 2010

Non-fiction
The Five Lives of Ben Hecht – 1977
Gold Diggers of 1929 – 1979
The Blue Notebook: Reports on Canadian Culture – 1985
The Crowded Darkness – 1988
The Gold Crusades: A Social History of the Gold Rushes, 1849-1929 – 1988
The Rise of the Canadian Newspaper – 1990
A Little Bit of Thunder – 1993
The Book of Assassins – 2001
River of Gold: The Fraser and Cariboo Gold Rushes – 2008

Biography
The Gentle Anarchist: A Life of George Woodcock – 1998

Memoir
Notes from a Journal – 1987
Travels By Night: A Memoir – 1994
Way Down Deep in the Belly of the Beast: A Memoir – 1996
The Writing Life: Journals 1975 - 2005 – 2013

Travel writing
Year of the Horse: A Journey through Russia and China – 1991
The Other China: Journeys around Taiwan – 1995
Running Away to Sea: Round the World on a Tramp Freighter – 1998
Three Pagodas Pass: A Roundabout Journey to Burma – 2002
One Russia, Two Chinas – 2004
Indochina Now and Then – 2012

Anthologies edited
A George Woodcock Reader – 1980
Carl Sandburg at the Movies: A Poet in the Silent Era 1920-1927 – 1985 (with Dale Fetherling)
Documents in Canadian Art – 1987
Documents in Canadian Film – 1988
The Broadview Book of Canadian Anecdotes – 1988
Best Canadian Essays 1989 – 1989
Best Canadian Essays 1990 – 1990
The Vintage Book of Canadian Memoirs – 2001

References

External links
George Fetherling's entry in The Canadian Encyclopedia
George Fetherling at Geist.com

1949 births
American emigrants to Canada
Canadian male journalists
Canadian male novelists
20th-century Canadian poets
20th-century Canadian male writers
Canadian male poets
21st-century Canadian poets
20th-century Canadian novelists
21st-century Canadian novelists
Living people
Harbourfront Festival Prize winners
21st-century Canadian male writers